Dubery is a surname. Notable people with the surname include:

David Dubery (born 1948), South-African born British composer, pianist, vocal coach, and academic
Harry Dubery, British labour movement activist

See also
Dubey